George Washington Bacon (1830–1922) was an American mapmaker and publisher who developed a successful business producing maps of London.

In 1861, Bacon founded a series of businesses. He became bankrupt in 1867, after failing to keep on top of managing these businesses.

In 1870, Bacon started his business, G.W. Bacon & Co., on 127 Strand, London. He based his atlases on the plates used by Edward Weller for his Weekly Dispatch Atlas. In 1893, he bought the map business of James Wyld.

Around 1900, G.W. Bacon was purchased by the Scottish publishing house of W.& A.K. Johnston and incorporated into their own. Maps using the Bacon brand were being produced as late as 1956. About 1967 their name was changed to Johnston & Bacon.

Selected publications
The New Ordnance Atlas of the British Isles.

See also

Archibald Constable
Thomas Constable (printer and publisher)
Archibald Fullarton

References

1830 births
1922 deaths
Maps of London
American cartographers
American publishers (people)
American expatriates in the United Kingdom